José Uzcátegui (born 24 December 1990) is a Venezuelan professional boxer who held the IBF super middleweight title from 2018 to 2019.

Professional career

On 16 February 2013 he beat "Porky" Rogelio Medina via unanimous decision over ten rounds.

In the same year he won by a technical knockout in the fourth round against Michel Rosales and also defeated Francisco Villanueva by a technical knockout in the first round.

On 20 May 2017, Uzcátegui faced Andre Dirrell for the vacant IBF interim super middleweight title. Uzcátegui started off strong, controlling the opening rounds. Dirrell saw his success come at the start of the fourth round, countering Uzcátegui and scoring well during the round. In the following rounds, the fight was action-packed with both fighters trading from close range. At the end of the eighth round, Uzcátegui delivered a three-punch combination on Dirrell, of which the third punch was after the bell rang. Uzcátegui was disqualified by the referee and Dirrell was proclaimed the winner. After the fight was over, Dirrell's trainer and uncle Leon Lewson punched Uzcátegui while he was in his corner, which led to other altercations in the ring, which had to be sorted out by security and the local police. 

Later the IBF's president, Daryl Peoples, said, although the Maryland commission agreed with the referees (Bill Clancy) ruling, that he made several errors in his handling of the match and thus the IBF ordered an immediate rematch. Peoples said at the time, in part, "The referee made it clear that he had ruled the blow to Dirrell after the bell was 'illegal'. However, the referee did not determine whether the 'illegal' punch was intentional or accidental pursuant to [IBF] guidelines. Had the referee determined that the 'illegal' punch was accidental, the bout would have resulted in a technical decision awarded to Jose Uzcategui, who was ahead on the judges' scorecards after eight rounds had been scored."

In his next fight, Uzcátegui fought Dirrell in a rematch for the IBF interim supermiddleweight title. Uzcátegui was hurting Direll throughout the fight, as Dirrell was bleeding early on in the fight. Jacob 'Stitch' Duran, Dirrell's cutman decided to instruct the referee to stop the fight in the eighth round, leading to an eighth-round technical knockout win for Uzcátegui.

On 13 January 2019, Uzcátegui faced undefeated Caleb Plant in his first defense of the full version of the IBF super middleweight title. He lost via unanimous decision via scores of 116–110, 115–111 and 116–110 all in favor of Plant, after being knocked down in the second and fourth rounds.

Professional boxing record

See also
List of world super-middleweight boxing champions

References

External links

Jose Uzcátegui - Profile, News Archive & Current Rankings at Box.Live

   

1990 births
Living people
Venezuelan male boxers
People from Mérida (state)
Venezuelan people of Basque descent
Venezuelan emigrants to Mexico
Venezuelan expatriate sportspeople in Mexico
Middleweight boxers
Super-middleweight boxers
World super-middleweight boxing champions
International Boxing Federation champions